Krasnokamensk Airport  is an airport in Zabaykalsky Krai, Russia located 7 km south of Krasnokamensk. Services prop transports.  It contains a single utilitarian tarmac but is well-maintained, with first-rate construction, and can easily service jets.

References
RussianAirFields.com

Airports built in the Soviet Union
Airports in Zabaykalsky Krai